Kenneth Vargo (born c. 1934) is an American gridiron football player who played for the Ottawa Rough Riders. He played college football at Ohio State University. Vargo was selected in the ninth round of the 1956 NFL Draft by the Chicago Bears, but played instead in the CFL. He was named an all-star for the 1956 CFL season.

References

1930s births
Living people